Dyett is a surname. Notable people with the surname include:

People 
Gilbert Dyett (1891–1964), Australian soldier
Isidor Dyett (fl. 1862–1863), Chief Magistrate of Anguilla
Walter Dyett (1901–1969), American violinist and music educator
 Dyett High School, public arts high school in Chicago, named for the educator